Bernadette Logue is a Spiritual Life Coach and Author.  She founded her coaching practice and community in 2010.

Works 
 Pinch Me: How Following The Signals Changed My Life Bernadette Logue (2012.) , 
 Going Out on a Limb: How Signals Led Me Beyond My Limits and Into Truth Bernadette Logue (2013.) , 
 Unleash Your Life: 166 Truths to Unlock Your Inner Peace, Freedom & Success Bernadette Logue (2014.) ,

References 

Living people
People educated at Kuranui College
Year of birth missing (living people)